My Yahoo! is a start page or web portal which combines personalized Yahoo! features, content feeds and information. The site was launched in 1996 and was one of the company's most popular creations.

Applications of My Yahoo

My Yahoo’s purpose is to have users personalize their pages.

The appearance, layout and content of the main Yahoo homepage is standard, My Yahoo offers customization. On it users can apply themes, add sites, add widgets, rearrange the layout, and add tabs to the page.

A MyYahoo page allows access to almost everything needed on one page. Applications and programs that allow access to social networking, Lottery numbers, a mail aggregator, a news aggregator, gaming applications, etc... The goal is to give people access to everything they're interested in on a single page.

Users are able to link to Yahoo! Answers.

Provides the option to link Yahoo Local. Enabling local search capabilities.

In 2011, they created a mobile app.

RSS features
Yahoo's personalized pages are less specialized than less popular sites. It is more stable 
It is also one of the fastest RSS readers.
52% of MyYahoo users are aware of RSS tools and 39% use RSS tools.
Many websites have a “Add to MyYahoo” button to make adding an RSS feed to MyYahoo simpler.

Criticism
My Yahoo can't consolidate different feeds resulting in the need for multiple streams.

Since the September 2013 redesign users have complained of numerous issues:
Font size is too large and cannot be changed
Applications are less configurable
Weather app uses auto-locate instead of remembering a specified place
Column resizing is no longer allowed
Forced inclusion of a large Yahoo search bar

On 24 August 2017, many users reported that all RSS feeds stopped working.

See also
iGoogle
My Excite
My Lycos
MSN

References

External links

Yahoo!
News aggregators
Web portals